Goar Hlgatian (born 14 May 1975) is an Armenian chess player. She is a Woman International Master (WIM) since 1996 and three-time Armenian Women's chess champion (1996, 1997 and 2001).

Weblinks

References

1975 births
Living people
Armenian female chess players